The following is a list of research laboratories that focus on machine translation.

List

See also
Asia-Pacific Association for Machine Translation 
Association for Machine Translation in the Americas
European Association for Machine Translation

References

Machine translation
Machine translation research laboratories